The RoadRunner Turbo Indy 300 at Kansas was an IndyCar Series race held at Kansas Speedway in Kansas City, Kansas. The IRL Indycar Series debuted the race in 2001.

The first Indy/Championship races in the Kansas City area city took place in 1922-1924, at now-demolished Kansas City Speedway in Kansas City, Missouri. AAA held four races at the  board track over three years.

In 2007, the race was run on April 29, 2007. The move was made at the request of spectators and participants, in hopes of cooler weather for race day. The first six years saw the race held on very hot and humid July days, making it hard for the fans and drivers. With its new date, it will mark the last IRL race before the Indianapolis 500.

The 2007 event marked the one of the very few times three women have competed at the same time in a major North American race. Danica Patrick, Sarah Fisher and Milka Duno finished 7th, 12th, and 14th respectively.

The 2010 event saw it be the undercard race to the NASCAR Camping World Truck Series O'Reilly Auto Parts 250 on Sunday, instead of the other way, as the other nine race were.  This decision was made in order to have the Truck race not run against the NASCAR Sprint Cup Series Crown Royal 400 at Richmond International Raceway under NASCAR's television restrictions prohibiting two national series from running at the same time.

Past winners

AAA Championship car history

Indycar Series

Indy Pro Series/Indy Lights winners

References
IndyCar.com race page
http://www.kansasspeedway.com

 
Recurring sporting events established in 2001
Recurring events disestablished in 2010